Groove is a 2000 American film directed by Greg Harrison. It portrays one night in the San Francisco underground rave scene. Through a single email, the word spreads that a huge rave is going to take place in an abandoned warehouse. John Digweed has a cameo as himself and also contributed to the soundtrack with Nick Muir, under their production alias Bedrock.

Plot
Groove tells the story of an all-night rave. The film is broken up into segments according to which DJ is spinning and features real-life DJs Forest Green, WishFM, Polywog, and Digweed. Introverted aspiring writer David Turner is reluctantly dragged to a rave at a warehouse by his brother Colin. David takes ecstasy for the first time and makes a romantic connection with fellow raver, Leyla, who has newly moved to the Bay Area from New York.

Cast

Production
After being turned down by studios for funding, production costs were met by selling shares of the film to investors similar to angel investment of a startup company.

The film was shot in the San Francisco area and included scenes at Pier One, 
Fillmore Street, China Basin, and the Bay Bridge. Principal photography took place in 24 days in August and September of 1999.

Release
Groove premiered at the 2000 Sundance Film Festival, where it was acquired for distribution for $1.5 million by Sony Pictures Classics. It was given a limited theatrical release on June 9, 2000.

Reception
On review aggregator Rotten Tomatoes, the film holds an approval rating of 57% based on 51 reviews, with a weighted average rating of 6.1/10. The website's critical consensus reads, "Though high on energy and great techno tunes, Grooves characters and plotlines are too clichéd to be engaging." On Metacritic, the film has a weighted average score of 54 out of 100, based on 25 critics, indicating "mixed or average reviews".

At the 16th Independent Spirit Awards, Groove was nominated for the John Cassavetes Award.

See also
Go, another film about rave culture made a year earlier
Human Traffic, a UK film about the rave culture made the same year

References

External links

2000 films
2000 directorial debut films
2000 drama films
2000 independent films
Films about drugs
Films set in San Francisco
Films shot in San Francisco
American LGBT-related films
LGBT-related drama films
2000 LGBT-related films
2000s English-language films
2000s American films